A ground-adjustable propeller is a simple type of aircraft variable-pitch propeller where the blade angle can be adjusted between pre-set limits of fine and coarse pitch.  As its name implies, a ground-adjustable propeller may be adjusted only when the aircraft is on the ground and when the engine is not running. To adjust the propeller, the blades are loosened in the hub, a new angle set and then the hub tightened.

Ground-adjustable propellers, which tend to be  found on light aircraft and very light aircraft, are much cheaper and lighter in weight than in-flight-adjustable propellers.  Although a ground-adjustable propeller is much less versatile than an in-flight-adjustable equivalent, nevertheless, compared to a fixed pitch propeller, a ground-adjustable propeller means that pitch changes can be made on the ground to optimise the aircraft for current payload and flying conditions.

Manufacturers
 Arplast EcoProp
 Ivoprop
 Warp Drive Inc
 Woodcomp

See also
List of aircraft propeller manufacturers

References 

Propellers